Omar Hugo Gómez (3 October 1955 – 4 May 2021) nicknamed Indio (Indian) was an Argentine footballer, best known for his time as player for Quilmes Atlético Club (1974–1978) where he distinguished himself for his classic gambetas (Dribbling).

Career 
Gómez was champion of the 1978 Argentine Primera División tournament with Quilmes. During his career at the club, he ascended twice, one in 1975 to the Primera División and one to the Primera Nacional in 1986–1987. As manager, he worked with Club Cerro Porteño Presidente Franco in 2000 in Paraguay. He also played in Paraguay as well as other Argentine clubs, such as Newell's Old Boys and Defensa y Justicia. Gómez also took part in indoor football in the United States, playing in Kansas, Dallas and New York.

Death 
Gómez died from COVID-19 in Florencio Varela, Buenos Aires, on 4 May 2021, at the age of 65.

References 

1955 births
2021 deaths
Argentine footballers
Association football midfielders
Major Indoor Soccer League (1978–1992) players
People from Quilmes
Quilmes Atlético Club footballers
Newell's Old Boys footballers
Dallas Tornado players
Defensa y Justicia footballers
Deaths from the COVID-19 pandemic in Argentina
Sportspeople from Buenos Aires Province
Argentine expatriate sportspeople in the United States
Argentine expatriate footballers
Expatriate soccer players in the United States
Wichita Wings (MISL) players
New York Arrows players